Predrag Miletić (born August 17, 1984) is a Serbian professional basketball player who currently plays for Klosterneuburg Dukes of the Österreichische Basketball Bundesliga.

Professional career
In the 2016–17 season, Miletić was named the Most Valuable Player of the Austrian ABL, after averaging 19.1 points per game.

References

External links
 Predrag Miletić at abaliga.com

1984 births
Living people
ABA League players
Basketball League of Serbia players
BC Khimik players
BC Zepter Vienna players
CSU Asesoft Ploiești players
KK Radnički Kragujevac (2009–2014) players
KK Napredak Kruševac players
Serbian expatriate basketball people in Austria
Serbian expatriate basketball people in Romania
Serbian expatriate basketball people in Ukraine
Serbian men's basketball players
Shooting guards
Sportspeople from Kraljevo
Xion Dukes Klosterneuburg players